Cholomyia is a genus of bristle flies in the family Tachinidae. There are at least four described species in Cholomyia.

Species
These four species belong to the genus Cholomyia:
 Cholomyia acromion (Wiedemann, 1824) c g
 Cholomyia calceata (Wulp, 1891) c g
 Cholomyia filipes Walker, 1858 c g
 Cholomyia inaequipes Bigot, 1884 i c g b
Data sources: i = ITIS, c = Catalogue of Life, g = GBIF, b = Bugguide.net

References

Further reading

External links

 
 

Tachininae
Taxa named by Jacques-Marie-Frangile Bigot